Hilara thoracica is a species of fly in the family Empididae. It is found in the  Palearctic .

References

Empididae
Insects described in 1827
Asilomorph flies of Europe
Taxa named by Pierre-Justin-Marie Macquart